Foxface were a Glasgow-based Scottish rock band featuring Michael Angus (vocals, guitar), John Ferguson (drums, accordion, banjo, mandolin) and Jenny Bell (bass, vocals).

History
Foxface started life as the solo acoustic project of Michael Angus, previously of Peeps into Fairyland. Along the way he was joined by John Ferguson, also ex-Peeps into Fairyland, before the lineup was completed by Jenny Bell.

After disbanding in 2009, Michael Angus went on to form Make Love with David Gow (Sons and Daughters) and Colin Kearney (Eska).

Members
Michael Angus – Vocals, guitar
John Ferguson – Drums, accordion, banjo, mandolin
Jenny Bell – Bass, vocals
Andrew Smith (Laeto) – Guitar

Discography

Albums
 This Is What Makes Us (2007)

EPs
Foxface EP (2003)

Singles
 Monster Seas / Across To Texa 7" (2006)

References

External links
Official website
Myspace
Last FM page

Scottish indie rock groups
Scottish folk music groups
Gargleblast Records artists